Franc Péret is a French cameraman, director and photographer. He is a specialist on Asia.

Biography

1996–2007

Péret began working in France as a freelance photographer from 1987 for motorsport (Moto Journal, Moto Crampons, Moto1) and travel magazines. Between 1994 and 1995 he did much work for the magazines  and Biba.

From 1994 to 1996, he mostly spent his life in Taipei, working as a still photographer in the movie industry. During those intensive two and a half years, Péret learned film-making in the field, getting closer to the position of assistant director and finally director of photography.

In 1995, Péret was invited by the director Wang Tong to be the stage photographer for the movie Hong Shizi (Red Kaki).

From 1998 to 2003, he set up his life in Japan, writing and shooting travel report for Japanese magazines (Hot Bike Japan, Goggle, BMW bike, Garrr...) and for the leading motorcycle magazine in France, Moto Journal, read by more than 35,000 every week.

Settled in Asia, Péret shot the short movie Summers (Leon Dai's first movie) and won the prize for the best first movie at the 2001 Taiwan Golden Horse Award. The movie was honored during the Clermont-Ferrand Short Movie Festival.

After two years back in France to lead two major motorcycle magazines as chief editor of Moto Crampons and Freestyle Motocross, Péret decided to gradually go back to Asia by setting up his new activities as film and commercial director/cameraman in Shanghai.

Additionally, Péret created a photography course and a filmmaking course in Shanghai as part of the Expat Learning Center (ELC Shanghai). Due to his pioneering involvement, he became the most experienced photography teacher in Shanghai and the first to set up a filmmaking class which already released 3 short movies: "Hidden Talent", "Serial Denatist" and "Dysfunction".

Since 2006, Péret shot and realized six short movies, mainly in Shanghai, where he currently lives.

In 2007 his short movie Mosquito Killer was honored at the Shanghai Short Movie Festival.

2008–2014

Since 2008 Péret has worked for Sygma Corbis as a photographer. He was invited to photograph Karen Mok and Jay Chou for a Toyota advertisement.

He was invited to film the first  (French Music Festival) in Shanghai in 2010.
The same year, Péret shot and realized an MTV-style music video of "Shanghai" for the French singer Dantes Dailiang, The clip was shot in two versions, one in French and Chinese, one in Chinese. The music video was broadcast on Chinese television and is played in Shanghai clubs.

In 2014, the Expat Learning Center in Shanghai suddenly stopped its activities. Péret is continuing his teaching in photography and filmmaking by building up his own structure through his website.

Short films

Mosquito Killer (2007) – shot in Shanghai, 15 minutes
Never Alone Again (2008) – shot in  Shanghai, 10 minutes
Hidden Talent (2010) – shot in  Shanghai, 10 minutes
Serial Dentist (2010) – shot in Shanghai, 1 minute
Double Detente (2010) – shot in Switzerland, 2 minutes
Marlene (2011) – shot in Shanghai, 7 minutes
Dysfunction (2011) – shot in Shanghai, 6 minutes
Revol’verte (2011) – shot in France, 10 minutes
Finger Up (2012) – shot in Shanghai, 5 minutes
La Deuche From Hell (2012) – shot in France, 5 minutes
Sweet and Sour, My Ex-Girl Friends (2012) – shot in Shanghai, 3 minutes
 (2013) – shot in Shanghai, 4 minutes
L'annonce (2013) – shot in France, 7 minutes
12th Floor (2013) – shot in Shanghai, 5 minutes

Music videos

 2010: Shanghai (single) by Dantès Dailiang
 2012: Oh ma Chérie by Dailiang
 2014: Douce Chine by Dailiang
 2017: Wo Ai Bulietani by Dailiang

References

External links

Official Franc Péret Database
Promotion Video Production
Advertisement Video Production
Motos Pics

French film directors
Living people
Year of birth missing (living people)